"Jerusalem (Out Of Darkness Comes Light)" is a song by American reggae singer Matisyahu, produced by Jimmy Douglass & The Ill Factor, and first released in 2006 on his major label debut, Youth. A new version was recorded later in 2006 with Sly & Robbie and was released as a digital single on September 19, 2006.

Overview
The song itself is based on Psalm 137, verses 5–6, one of the most well known of the Psalms:

The psalm is said to have been written during the Babylonian Exile by Jeremiah expressing the desire of the Israelites to return to Jerusalem.

Matisyahu used the chorus lyrics of Break My Stride by Matthew Wilder as the bridge in this single. There are two versions of the song, the single version which is subtitled (Out of Darkness Comes Light) which is a funky-rock version, and an alternative slower dancehall reggae version.

Music video
On 31 September 2006, Matisyahu released a music video for "Jerusalem (Out of Darkness Comes Light) ". The video uses extensive imagery from the Holocaust  and Eastern European Jewish History, and the Civil Rights Movement, as well as using pictures to create a central composite of the Western Wall. This is the first of Matisyahu's videos which does not take place outdoors, and is the first which contains extensive symbolism rather than straightforward scenes.

Charts

See also
List of songs about Jerusalem

References

2006 songs
2006 singles
Matisyahu songs
Songs written by Matthew Wilder
Songs about Jerusalem